Big Rigs: Over the Road Racing is a 2003 racing video game developed by Stellar Stone and published by GameMill Publishing. The player controls a semi-trailer truck (a "big rig") and races a stationary opponent through checkpoints on US truck routes. Stellar Stone, based in California, outsourced the game's development to Ukraine, and the game was released on November 20, 2003. Due to a multitude of bugs and lack of proper gameplay, Big Rigs was critically panned, became the worst-rated game on review aggregator websites Metacritic and GameRankings, and has been frequently cited as one of the worst video games of all time by gaming publications. The game has also attracted a cult following since its release.

Gameplay 

Big Rigs: Over the Road Racing is a racing video game. Although the game's packaging states the objective as racing over US truck routes to be the first to deliver cargo and avoid arrest by the police, the game features no law enforcement. The player chooses from four playable semi-trailer trucks ("big rigs") and five truck routes, although selecting the fourth route will cause the game to crash. Once selected, the player navigates their truck through checkpoints using the arrow keys. Driving in reverse allows the truck to accelerate indefinitely, while releasing the associated key will instantly halt it.

There is no time limit to complete a race, and the opponent does not move. The player's truck can pass through the opponent and all objects placed on the route due to a lack of collision detection. Off-roading bears no traction penalty, hills can be ascended and descended without affecting the truck's speed, and traversal is possible in the emptiness outside the game map. Completing a race rewards the player with a trophy bearing the phrase .

Development and release 
The development of Big Rigs: Over the Road Racing was commissioned by Stellar Stone, a company based in Santa Monica, California, and founded in late 2000 that outsourced game development to Eastern European countries like Russia. Sergey Titov, the chief executive officer of TS Group Entertainment, licensed his Eternity game engine to Stellar Stone in exchange for a "large chunk of the company". According to him, Big Rigs was developed by a team in Ukraine. Although Titov is credited as the producer and co-programmer of the game, he claimed that he had neither had much input on the development, nor the possibility to halt the game's release. He stated that publisher GameMill Publishing initially sought to release one racing game stock keeping unit but later decided to split it in two—Big Rigs and Midnight Race Club—and shipped Big Rigs in what he believed to be a pre-alpha state.

The game was released on November 20, 2003, for Windows and distributed exclusively through Wal-Mart stores. Titov later offered to replace the game with one from the catalog of Activision Value, should a buyer send him their game copy, sales receipt, and registration card, which twenty people did.

Reception 

Big Rigs: Over the Road Racing received "overwhelming dislike", according to the review aggregator website Metacritic. Based on five critic reviews, the site calculated a weighted average rating of 8/100, its lowest ever. The game also stood as the all-time worst game on GameRankings. Big Rigs has been cited as one of the worst video games of all time by GameSpot (2004), PC Gamer (2010 and 2019), Kotaku (2012 and 2015), Computer and Video Games (2013), Hardcore Gamer (2014), The Guardian (2015), and GamesRadar+ (2017). On X-Plays March 2004 "Games You Should Never Buy" segment, co-host Morgan Webb described Big Rigs as "the worst game ever made" and refused to score it, as the program's rating system did not allow for a zero score. Steve Haske of GameZone regarded it as the "most abysmal" racing game in 2011.

Alex Navarro reviewed Big Rigs for GameSpot in January 2004 and criticized the game's high amount of bugs (including the absence of collision detection, enemy movement and game physics), lack of proper gameplay, and poor truck controls. Additionally, he labeled the game as "easily one of the worst-looking PC games released in years" and "almost completely broken and blatantly unfinished in nearly every way", declaring that Big Rigs was "as bad as your mind will allow you to comprehend". Navarro rated the game a 1/10 (described as "abysmal"), the lowest score on GameSpot up to that point. He later remarked that the game only received a 1/10 because it was the lowest possible score on GameSpot, arguing that the site should have introduced a 0/10 rating specifically for Big Rigs. The game remained the only one to have received that rating from GameSpot until 2013's Ride to Hell: Retribution. For the site's 2004 year-end accolades, Big Rigs was named the "Flat-Out Worst Game" and the editors stated that they would henceforth use the game's winning trophy as the representation for the award.

In 2014, Alex Carlson of Hardcore Gamer determined that, due to Big Rigs lack of a challenge, incentive to play, or ability to lose, it could not be accurately described as a game. According to Steven Strom of Ars Technica, "Big Rigs isn't just a failure of programming (thanks to numerous bugs and crashes). It's a failure of creativity." Hardcore Gaming 101s Garamoth was torn between calling Big Rigs "hilariously campy or just shamefully terrible".

Legacy 
Jason Schreier, writing for Kotaku in 2012, opined that the humorous video accompanying Navarro's Big Rigs review "immortalized" the game. A satirical review on Angry Video Game Nerd significantly contributed to the game's popularity. Big Rigs has attracted a cult following, with yourewinner.com forming a dedicated fansite. David Houghton of GamesRadar attributed the game's notoriety to its bugs, saying that, otherwise, "Big Rigs would simply be an unremarkable, long-forgotten racing also-ran, rather than the festival of hilarity it currently stands as". Titov went on to work for Riot Games on League of Legends before releasing The War Z in December 2012. In September 2008, he stated that he was still in possession of the source code for both Big Rigs and Eternity, but could not release the former because the game was still owned by Stellar Stone and GameMill.

The NYU Game Center exhibited Big Rigs as part of its Bad Is Beautiful: An Exhibition Exploring Fascinatingly Bad Games at the NYU Game Center in April 2012. Navarro performed a speedrun of the game for the January 2015 Awesome Games Done Quick charity event. The English test of the 2022 Polish Matura featured an excerpt from a Big Rigs review.

Notes

References

External links 
 

2003 video games
GameMill Entertainment games
North America-exclusive video games
Single-player video games
Truck racing video games
Video game memes
Video games developed in Ukraine
Video games set in the United States
Windows games
Windows-only games